List of presidents of the Legislative Council of Bermuda

List of presidents of the Senate of Bermuda

References

External links
https://web.archive.org/web/20140412122747/http://www.parliament.bm/Presidents_of_the_Legislative_Councel_and_Senate.aspx

Politics of Bermuda
Bermuda, Senate
Senate